The All-Russian Institute Of Aviation Materials (VIAM) is a state research centre of the Russian Federation based in Moscow, Russia, established in 1932.

VIAM has broad responsibility for research, development, testing, and certification of all metallic and nonmetallic materials used in the Russian aerospace industry. Over 90 percent of the materials used in Soviet aircraft and space vehicles were developed at VIAM.

Bibliography 
 List of VIAM publications in the Scientific electronic library elibrary.ru

References

Companies based in Moscow
Metal companies of the Soviet Union
Buran program
Research institutes in Russia
Research institutes in the Soviet Union
Aviation in the Soviet Union
Aerospace research institutes
Aviation research institutes
Aerospace engineering organizations
Research and development organizations
Federal State Unitary Enterprises of Russia
1932 establishments in the Soviet Union